Cassandra Bolyard Whyte is an American higher education administrator, teacher, and educational researcher. She is recognized for publication and leadership in the areas of higher education management, improving academic performance of students, campus planning and safety, predicting educational trends in. colleges and universities, and encouraging creativity in curriculum development. She is also experienced in helping facilitate campus architectural planning to meet educational vision and programming as well as higher education human resources management and motivation.

Career information 

Over several decades, Cassandra Whyte has worked as an administrator and/or member of the faculty at private and public higher education institutions in the United States. She has worked many years at West Virginia State University (WVSU) where she has served on the faculty and worked as Special Assistant to the President for Strategic Planning and Special Projects, Vice President for Administrative Services, Acting Vice President for Student Affairs, and in other leadership capacities. At WVSU she has worked at the Executive and Cabinet level for much of her tenure there and currently her major focus is on her faculty role. WVSU is a public, HBCU 1890 land-grant university.  Whyte also taught at the graduate level at Oregon State University and at the former West Virginia College of Graduate Studies. Previously, she served a decade at Davis and Elkins College (D & E), where she was on the faculty and a key participant in the strategic redesign of their academic curriculum to "Alternative Futures" that incorporated relevance and creativity with time-honored studies. The schedule was modified to include a winter term between fall and spring semesters which emphasized learning survival skills and independent study. Davis and Elkins College [D&E] is a private, church affiliated liberal arts college. Dr. Whyte also taught in corrections facilities.  Additionally, she administratively supervised the WVSU Public Safety Department of trained and certified law enforcement officers for twenty-four years during her cabinet tenure of supervising various departments.

Research and publications

In 1978, Whyte received a national educational research award from Oregon State University (OSU) and taught in their summer graduate education program that same year. The research dealt with Locus of Control and getting students pursuing higher education to accept responsibility for their behavior in regard to improvement of academic performance. Her publications range from juried professional journals to a Jossey-Bass Publishers New Directions sourcebook chapter. In 2002, Whyte was a member of a round table program held at Oxford University in England, where she presented a paper focusing upon the financial and technology future of higher education for the 21st Century. A salient project she helped develop and lead at Davis and Elkins College (D & E), the William James Program, received international notice in The Christian Science Monitor, in the early 1970s. The program emphasized group and individual counseling focusing upon accepting personal responsibility for educational performance and use of pragmatic approaches to motivate students to do their best work.

During the later 1980s, Whyte collected data suggesting how important information technology, also known as educational technology, would become for higher education into the future.  Eventually, early versions of computer-assisted learning experiences for students reinforced the locus of control concept as successful students were somewhat self-motivated during the process of technology-based interactive activities.  Into the 21st-century, the e-learning and personal computer-assisted learning devices were to be more frequently used by students and educators and more sophisticated institutional data collections became required. Also in that decade, Whyte researched and published about the focus of new student orientation programming to help with retention and in 2007 the international National Orientation Directors Association Journal editors reprinted the article in a 30th anniversary issue.

Campus planning activities

At West Virginia State University, working with a dedicated team, Whyte was able to draw upon artistic training from earlier educational attainments, interaction with colleagues and architects, along with educational and business experience, to help develop and cooperatively implement The WVSU Campus Master Plan for the University.  This is a plan for future campus facility and property development to safely accommodate educational programming needs and visions.

Biographic information

Cassandra Sue Bolyard Whyte was born in Grafton, West Virginia to Roy Everett Bolyard (1901–1983) and Georgia Ellen Deavers Bolyard (1909–1994) in 1947. In 1973, Dr. Whyte married William Rowland Whyte, Jr., a career corrections professional and educator. Their daughter, Jennifer Nicole Whyte Onks, married Brian Edward Onks, and their children are Thomas William Onks and Tyler Austin Onks. Cassandra Bolyard Whyte had three siblings: Eldora Marie Bolyard Nuzum, married Jack Robert Nuzum; Vonda Jean Bolyard Norris married Clyde Dale Norris; and Robert Glen Bolyard married Jacqueline Westfall Bolyard.

Whyte earned her Doctorate in Education (Ed. D) from West Virginia University in 1975 where she also earned a master's degree (M.A.). Prior to that she earned a bachelor's degree from what is now Fairmont State University (FSU). Over the years she did advanced study and workshops at other higher education institutions such as the University of Virginia, Marietta College, and other schools. Whyte has been a Licensed Professional Counselor (LPC) in the state of West Virginia and maintained a teaching certification.  Her interest in educational psychology, or how students learn and effectiveness of educational interventions, has been apparent in all of her work.

Educational Philosophy

Focusing upon opportunities which encourage individuals to accept responsibility for their education and lives has been an important focus of Whyte's research, teaching, counseling, and administrative style. This locus of control identification promotes confidence for student and employee performance in individual and team projects. Research and practice by Whyte indicate that through ownership of individual actions, there is greater opportunity to develop creative and entrepreneurial problem solving habits resulting in more frequent successes in school, work, and life endeavors. Her work corroborates theories of Julian Rotter in the academic setting.

Sources
Bolyard, Cassandra, (Whyte) "Creativity: An Integral Part of the Secondary School Curriculum",Education, 94, 2, November/December 1973, 190–192
 Whyte, Cassandra Bolyard, "Effective Counseling Methods for High-Risk College Freshmen", Measurement and Evaluation in Guidance, 10, 4, January 1978, 198–200
King, Michael,Fatherhood 101-Bonding Types and Building Long-Term Relationships, Clear View Press, Inc, Palm Coast, Florida, Testimonial pages, 2008, 1–2
Lauridsen Kurt and Whyte, Cassandra B. (1985) An Integrated Counseling and Learning Assistance Center-Chapter for New Directions Sourcebook. Jossey-Bass, Inc. 1985
Driggs, Jody and Dittoe, William, et al., "West Virginia State University 2006 Campus Master Plan", Silling Associates, (also Educational Facilities Consultants, LLC), Charleston, West Virginia, 2006. 1–57
Frost, John and (Whyte) Bolyard, Cassandra (1972)"Low-Achieving Freshmen Aided". The Christian Science Monitor, May 20, 1972
King, Michael, Fatherhood 101-Bonding Types and Building Long-Term Relationships, Clear View Press, Inc, Palm Coast, Florida, Testimonial pages, 2008, 1–2
Pellegrin, Amy, Herod, Rebecca Thompkins, FSU Maroon & White Editorial Board, "Fairmont State Alumni Shaping West Virginia", Maroon & White, Fairmont State University Foundation, Fairmont, WV, 21, Winter, 2007, 3
Ross, Thomas Richard, The Diamond Jubilee History of Davis & Elkins College, Davis and Elkins College, Elkins, West Virginia. 1980
Rotter, J. B. Social Learning and Clinical Psychology. Prentice-Hall, 1954
The 2006 West Virginia State University Campus Master Plan, Silling Associates, et al., Charleston, WV, 2006
Whyte,Cassandra B. and Whyte,William R. 1982."Accelerated Programs Behind Prison Walls". College Student Journal. 16.(1).70–74
Whyte, Cassandra B. "An Additional Look at Orientation Programs Nationally" Journal of the National Orientation Directors Association. (Reprint of 1986 article for 30th Anniversary Edition). Fall. 15. (1) 2007. 71–77
(Whyte), Cassandra Bolyard, "Creativity: An Integral Part of the Secondary School Curriculum",Education, 94, 2, November/December 1973, 190–192
 Whyte, Cassandra Bolyard, "Effective Counseling Methods for High-Risk College Freshmen", Measurement and Evaluation in Guidance, 10,4, January 1978, 198–200
Whyte, Cassandra B., "High-Risk College Freshmen and Locus of Control", Humanist Educator,correction in following issue, 16, 1977, 2–5
Whyte, Cassandra Bolyard, "Perceptions about Campus Law Enforcement and Safety", The West Virginia Mental Health Journal,1994–95, WVMHCA, West Virginia, 1–19
Whyte, Cassandra Bolyard, "Student Affairs-The Future", Journal of College Student Development, 30, January 1989, 86-89.

References

American women academics
American academic administrators
Educators from West Virginia
1947 births
Living people
People from Grafton, West Virginia
West Virginia University alumni
West Virginia State University faculty
Women academic administrators
21st-century American women